The Chinook Observer is a weekly newspaper serving the Long Beach Peninsula of Washington state. It is named after Chinook, Washington, where the paper was founded in 1900 by George Hibbert and Frank Gaither.

Hibbert sold the paper to John and Margaret Durkee in about 1923, who sold it to Bill Clancey in 1933, adding James O'Neil as a co-owner in 1937. O'Neil moved the paper to Long Beach, Washington in 1938. The paper was purchased by Craig and Geri Dennis in 1984, then purchased in 1988 by the East Oregonian Publishing Company, now called the EO Media Group and printed at The Daily Astorian. Matt Winters — a 1983 graduate of the University of Wyoming College of Law — became the paper's editor in 1991, and remained in that position as of 2019.

The Observer has a circulation of about 5,000. Its staff has won hundreds statewide awards in recent years, often finishing first, second or third in annual General Excellence judging, most recently winning first place in 2017. In 2018, the Chinook Observer won the statewide Public Service Award from the Washington Newspaper Publishers Association in recognition of its coverage of immigration issues and ICE enforcement activities.

The original Linotype machine, a Mergenthaler, was taken out of service in the 1970s and is on loan to the Columbia Pacific Heritage Museum in Ilwaco, Washington.

References

External links
 
History of Chinook, George Hibbert, Pacific County Historical Society, 1979
 Library of Congress "Chronicling America" entry
 Several items in The Washington Newspaper, Vol. 7 (1921)

Newspapers published in Washington (state)
Pacific County, Washington